Barnwell Manor is a Grade II listed country estate near the village of Barnwell, about  south of Oundle, in Northamptonshire, England. The historic former home of the Duke and Duchess of Gloucester, as of 2017 it was occupied by Windsor House Antiques. In September 2022, Prince Richard, Duke of Gloucester, put the manor up for sale for £4.75 million.

History
The estate was granted to the Montagu family in 1540 by King Henry VIII, and they kept it until 1913, when it was sold by the 6th Duke of Buccleuch. In the interim period (1913–1938), Prince Philip's future Private Secretary Sir Brian McGrath (1925–2016) grew up at the manor until his parents bought their own house. The house may have been rented to a series of tenants.

In 1938 Prince Henry, Duke of Gloucester, the third son of King George V, bought the house and estate with the bulk of his legacy from the late king.  The Duke's wife Alice was the daughter of the 7th Duke of Buccleuch, and had a fondness for the house which her grandfather had sold.

It was announced in January 1995 that the Gloucesters would vacate the house, so that Princess Alice could move to Kensington Palace to be with her son, Prince Richard, Duke of Gloucester. As of 2017, Windsor House Antiques occupies the estate.

In 2013 the High Court disallowed an application by West Coast Energy to build a wind farm close to the manor's lodge.  An appeal was subsequently dismissed. The appeal gained increased media attention because Justine Thornton, wife of the Labour leader Ed Miliband, was representing the appellant. The Duke of Gloucester had supported the proposal.

Architecture and grounds
The house has four reception rooms, seven principal bedrooms, and six bathrooms. It is a 40-room Grade II eighteenth-century manor house, with origins dating to 1586. The estate now comprises  farmed by the present Duke of Gloucester, and the ruined Barnwell Castle, built c.1266 by Berenger le Moyne, who sold it to Ramsey Abbey in 1276. The abbey held the castle until 1536, when it passed to the king. The Elizabethan manor house became the principal residence, and the living quarters and all internal buildings of the castle were demolished in 1704.

The house is listed Grade II on the National Heritage List for England.

References

External links

Country houses in Northamptonshire
North Northamptonshire
Grade II listed buildings in Northamptonshire
Grade II listed houses
Royal residences in the United Kingdom